Bing Maps Platform (previously Microsoft Virtual Earth) is a geospatial mapping platform produced by Microsoft. It allows developers to create applications that layer location-relevant data on top of licensed map imagery. The imagery includes samples taken by satellite sensors, aerial cameras (including 45 degree oblique "bird's eye" aerial imagery licensed from Pictometry International), Streetside imagery, 3D city models and terrain. 

Bing Maps Platform also provides a point-of-interest database including a search capability. Microsoft uses the Bing Maps Platform to power its Bing Maps product. 

Key features of the Bing Maps Platform include:

Photo-based images with features such as Streetside and 45 degree oblique "bird’s eye" views (nominally including 4 views at 90 degree viewpoint increments) that present data in context while simplifying orientation and navigation. 
The ability to overlay standard or custom data points and layers with different themes. 
Building-level geocoding for more than 70 million addresses in the United States. 
Developer support options available. 
Set of APIs available upon which developers can build applications.

See also
Apple Maps – Apple's mapping service
Bing Maps
Esri – Esri ArcGIS
Google Maps – Google's mapping service
MapQuest
Microsoft Research Maps – public domain (older than five years) satellite imagery via Microsoft servers
Nokia Maps – Nokia’s mapping service
OpenStreetMap – OpenStreetMap
Yahoo! Maps – Yahoo! Map Web Services

External links
Bing Maps Enterprise APIs
Bing Maps Documentation
Bing Maps Developer account
Bing Maps V8 Interactive SDK
Bing Maps Blog

Microsoft Bing
GIS software
Web Map Services
Keyhole Markup Language
Freeware
Astronomy software
Virtual globes
Earth sciences graphics software
Satellite imagery